The 1992 Korean Professional Football League was the tenth season of K League since its establishment in 1983.

League table

Awards

Main awards

Source:

Best XI

Source:

See also
 1992 Korean League Cup

References

External links
 RSSSF

K League seasons
1
South Korea
South Korea